Henry John Keupper (July 24, 1887 in Staunton, Illinois - August 14, 1960 in Marion, Illinois), was a professional baseball player who played pitcher in the Major Leagues in . He would play for the St. Louis Terriers.

External links

1887 births
1960 deaths
Major League Baseball pitchers
St. Louis Terriers players
Peoria Distillers players
Nashville Vols players
Chattanooga Lookouts players
Bloomington Bloomers players
People from Staunton, Illinois